Nausherwani tombs, also spelled as Noshirwani tombs, are located near Qila Ladgasht in Mashkel tehsil, Kharan District, Balochistan, Pakistan.

The Nausherwani tombs are a set of nine tombs dating back nearly 800 years. According to district gazetteer of Kharan (1906) there were nine tombs of which two have collapsed by 2004. Nikodar Ooghul belonged to the Arghun Dynasty and he converted to Islam and adopted the name Sultan Ahmad Khan in 681 Hijri (1282/1283).

See also
 Kharan District
 Mashkel
 Qila Ladgasht
 Damb

References

External links
 The mysterious Nausherwani tombs

Kharan District
Archaeological sites in Balochistan, Pakistan
History of Balochistan
Cemeteries in Balochistan, Pakistan